Land of Legends Raceway is a 1/2 mile dirt oval in Canandaigua, New York. As of 2020, the track hosts Modifieds, 305 Sprint Cars, Sportsman, and Street Stock. The track is located on and a part of the Ontario County Fairgrounds.

The track was the site where on August 9, 2014, NASCAR driver Tony Stewart collided with Kevin Ward, Jr., who was standing on track. Ward died from injuries sustained from the collision.  The incident was investigated, with officials discovering Ward had competed while intoxicated by cannabinoids (marijuana).  It led to World Racing Group, which sanctions selected races at the circuit, imposing drug testing.

References

Canandaigua, New York
Motorsport venues in New York (state)
Sports venues in Ontario County, New York